Romania is a European Parliament constituency for elections in the European Union covering the member state of Romania. It is currently represented by thirty-three Members of the European Parliament.

Current Members of the European Parliament

Elections

2007 

The 2007 European election was Romania's first election since joining the European Union (EU) which occurred during the same year.

2009 

The 2009 European election was the seventh election to the European Parliament and the second for Romania.

2014 

The 2014 European election was the eighth election to the European Parliament and the third for Romania.

2019 

The 2019 European election was the ninth election to the European Parliament and the fourth for Romania.

2024 

The 2024 European election will be the tenth election to the European Parliament and the fifth for Romania.

References

External links
 European Election News by European Election Law Association (Eurela)
 List of MEPs europarl.europa.eu

European Parliament elections in Romania
European Parliament constituencies
2007 establishments in Romania
Constituencies established in 2007